Lauren Nicholson (née Kieffer, born June 6, 1987, Mount Carmel, Illinois) is an American equestrian who competes in eventing. As the leading USA rider in the Rolex Kentucky Three Day Event CCI, she won the Pinnacle Cup Trophy in 2014 and again in 2016, both times riding the Dutch Warmblood mare Veronica with whom she has been paired since 2013. Nicholson was a member of the gold medal-winning US eventing team at the 2015 Pan American Games, riding Meadowbrook's Scarlett.

Nicholson comes from a "non-horsey" family, the only daughter of a diesel mechanic and an accountant. She began riding lessons at age six, and began competing in eventing at age 12. She is closely associated with champion equestrians and trainers David and Karen O'Connor, with whom she has served a working apprenticeship since her late teens.

As of April 2016, Nicholson was the world's ninth-ranked eventing equestrian according to the Fédération Equestre Internationale (FEI), and at the time of the 2016 Summer Olympics in which Nicholson competed, was considered the top-ranked female eventing athlete
in the United States.

In 2019, Nicholson was placed in the top 10 in the Burghley Horse Trials 5* aboard the American-bred Anglo-Arabian Vermiculus, the top placing among the contingent of riders from the United States.  Vermiculus is a full brother to her 2010 Kentucky Three-Day Event horse Snooze Alarm.  In discussing the training of Vermiculus, Nicholson has said, "You have to be very conscientious producing them[Anglo-Arabs], because they’re very, very smart."

CCI***** results

International Championship Results

References

American event riders
American female equestrians
1987 births
Living people
People from Mount Carmel, Illinois
Sportspeople from Illinois
Pan American Games gold medalists for the United States
Equestrians at the 2015 Pan American Games
Equestrians at the 2016 Summer Olympics
Olympic equestrians of the United States
Pan American Games medalists in equestrian
Medalists at the 2015 Pan American Games
21st-century American women